Ghosted is an American supernatural sitcom that premiered on Fox on October 1, 2017. The series debuted via streaming on the social media website Twitter on September 21 and 24, 2017. The show stars Craig Robinson and Adam Scott as two polar opposites recruited to investigate paranormal activity in Los Angeles. On November 29, 2017, it was announced that Fox had ordered 6 more episodes, for a total of 16. On June 28, 2018, Fox canceled the series after one season.

Plot
The series follows a sharp-witted skeptic and a genius true believer in the paranormal who are recruited by an organization called The Bureau Underground to investigate a series of "unexplained" activities that are occurring in the Los Angeles area, which are supposedly tied to a mysterious entity that could threaten the existence of the human species. The second part of the season then focuses on conspiracy theories following Leroy and Max finding the Bureau Underground is bugged and questioning if Paranormal activities actually exist.

Cast and characters

Main
 Craig Robinson as Leroy Wright, a mall cop and former police detective who was fired from the LAPD after his partner was killed during a call. He has a nephew he is close to.
 Adam Scott as Max Jennifer, a book store employee and former Stanford professor. He wrote a book on the multiverse. His wife was abducted by aliens, and he was fired from Stanford University when no one believed him.
 Ally Walker as Captain Ava Lafrey, the captain of the Bureau. 
 Adeel Akhtar as Barry Shaw, a scientist at the Bureau.
 Amber Stevens West as Annie Carver, a technological employee at the Bureau.

Recurring
 Kevin Dunn as Merv Minette, the new Captain of The Bureau Underground.
 Britt Lower as Claire Jennifer, Max's wife.

Guests
 Dax Shepard as Sam, an AI system.
 Beck Bennett as Bob, a friendly Bureau employee. 
 Sam McMurray as Campbell McMasters, a wealthy country club member. 
 Mo Collins as Monica Yates, a trophy wife of a wealthy country club member. 
 John Getz as Romsio, the director of the Bureau Underground and Lafrey's boss.

Production
Ghosted was created and executive produced by Tom Gormican (who also serves as writer) with Craig Robinson and Adam Scott (who also star in the lead roles), Naomi Scott, Mark Schuman, Oly Obst, Kevin Etten, and director Jonathan Krisel. On August 30, 2016, Fox commissioned a production commitment for the pilot. On May 10, 2017, Fox ordered the pilot to series. On November 29, 2017, it was announced that Fox had ordered 6 additional episodes, bringing its first season total to 16. It was also announced that Kevin Etten was being replaced as showrunner by Paul Lieberstein which focused on retooling the second part of the first season into more of an office setting rather than a paranormal show. The series was canceled after one season in June 2018.

Filming
Ghosted is a single-camera series produced by Gettin' Rad Productions, 3 Arts Entertainment, and 20th Century Fox Television.

Casting
On August 30, 2016, Fox cast Craig Robinson as Leroy Wright and Adam Scott as Max Jennifer. Edi Patterson was cast as Delilah on February 14, 2017. On March 1, 2017, Ally Walker was cast as Captain Lafrey. Adeel Akhtar was cast as Barry on March 9, 2017. On July 12, Amber Stevens West was cast as Annie, who was played by Edi Patterson in the pilot.

Broadcast
The series began to air on Fox's sister network FXX in the weeks following the premiere. In the United Kingdom, it began airing on ITV2 on October 30, 2017. In Latin America, it broadcast the 16 episodes from June to July 2018 on FX.

Episodes

Reception

Ratings

Critical reviews
Ghosted received mixed to positive reviews. The review aggregator website Rotten Tomatoes reported a 62% approval rating based on 26 reviews, with an average rating of 5.92/10. The website's critical consensus reads "Craig Robinson and Adam Scott's odd-couple chemistry is strong enough to carry Ghosted through a first season that finds the show a promising work in progress."

References

External links

2010s American supernatural television series
2010s American single-camera sitcoms
2017 American television series debuts
2018 American television series endings
English-language television shows
Fox Broadcasting Company original programming
Fictional government investigations of the paranormal
Television series by 3 Arts Entertainment
Television series by 20th Century Fox Television
Television shows set in Los Angeles